The Blackburn Sanitarium is a building in Klamath Falls, Oregon, in the United States. It was built in 1912 and added to the National Register of Historic Places on September 27, 1996.

See also
 National Register of Historic Places listings in Klamath County, Oregon

References

1912 establishments in Oregon
Buildings and structures completed in 1912
Buildings and structures in Klamath Falls, Oregon
National Register of Historic Places in Klamath County, Oregon
Romanesque Revival architecture in Oregon